Kishore Bharati Bhagini Nivedita (Co-ed) College, is an undergraduate enginnering and medical college in Behala, West Bengal, India. It is affiliated with the University of Calcutta.

Departments

Science

Chemistry
Zoology
Botany
Statistics
Electronics

Arts and Commerce

Bengali
English
French 
History
Geography
Political Science
Philosophy
Education
Commerce

Engineering
Electronics
AI and Machine Learning
Mechanical
Production

See also 
List of colleges affiliated to the University of Calcutta
Education in India
Education in West Bengal

References

External links
 Kishore Bharati Bhagini Nivedita (Co-ed) College

University of Calcutta affiliates
Universities and colleges in Kolkata
2001 establishments in West Bengal
Educational institutions established in 2001